Kikelomo Longe, also known as Kike, is the current commissioner for Industry Trade and Investment of Ogun State.

Early life and education 
She studied accountancy at the University of Lagos UNILAG and graduated with a second class upper Bsc. degree in Accounting.

Career 
Longe was the former head of investor relations and fund administration at African Capital Alliance (ACA). She joined the organisation  in 1999, and later rose to rank of vice president. She was a vice president of Africa Capital Alliance. She was responsible for marketing, fundraising and investor relations. She started her career with Deloitte as an audit trainee and won two national prizes at qualifying examinations and qualified as a chartered accountant. Later she joined Ventures & Trusts Limited (V&T) as the financial controller.

References

External links 
 ogunstate.gov.ng

Living people
Nigerian women in politics
People from Ogun State
Lagos State University alumni
Year of birth missing (living people)
Nigerian women accountants